Confession is an American old-time radio crime drama anthology series. It was broadcast on NBC from July 5, 1953, to September 13, 1953, as a summer replacement for Dragnet.

Format
Confession dramatized material from files of corrections departments from across the United States. Radio historian John Dunning compared Confession to Dragnet, writing, "Confession had a texture and sound not unlike Dragnet; indeed, the Dragnet influence was evident throughout." Although both programs featured crimes taken from real life, he added, "Dragnet began with the crime while Confession unfolded in reverse order."

Each episode of the program began with the following dialog:Criminal: I make this confession of my own free will because it is true. There wasn't any force or violence used upon my person to induce me to make these statements. Without promise of immunity or gratuity, I confess.
Announcer: You understand, of course, your statements will be made public to the radio program Confession?

Criminal: I do.
Announcer: You are listening to Confession. This confession is a matter of documented record. You will hear the story of this crime experience in the person's own words. This is Confession.

Personnel
The only regular character on Confession was Richard A. McGee, director of the California State Department of Corrections. He was portrayed by Paul Frees. Other actors heard frequently in supporting roles were Parley Baer, Herb Butterfield, Don Diamond, Sam Edwards, Virginia Christine, Virginia Gregg, Stacy Harris, Jonathan Hole, Peter Leeds, Joyce McCluskey, Marvin Miller, Jack Moyles, and Barney Phillips. The real Richard McGee appeared midway through each program to remind listeners, "Crime does not pay."

John Wald was the announcer. Homer Canfield and Warren Lewis were producers, and Canfield was the director. Music was by J. Frederick Albech. Writers were Lou Rusoff and Don Brinkley, and Warren Lewis was the script supervisor.

References

External links

Logs
 Log of episodes of Confession from Jerry Haendiges Vintage Radio Logs
 Log of episodes of Confession from Old Time Radio Researchers Group
 Log of episodes of Confession from radioGOLDINdex
 Log of episodes of Confession from The Digital Deli Too

Streaming
 Episodes of Confession from Internet Archive
 Episodes of Confession from Old Time Radio Researchers Group Library

1953 radio programme debuts
1953 radio programme endings
NBC radio programs
American radio dramas
1950s American radio programs